Minuscule 266 (in the Gregory-Aland numbering), ε 1393 (Soden), is a Greek minuscule manuscript of the New Testament, on parchment. Palaeographically it has been assigned to the 13th century. The manuscript has complex contents. It has full marginalia.

Description 
The codex contains the text of the four Gospels on 282 parchment leaves. The text is written in one column per page, in 23 lines per page.

There is also a division according to the smaller Ammonian Sections (in Mark 237 sections, the last section in 16:15), but there is no references to the Eusebian Canons.

Text 
The Greek text of the codex is a representative of the Byzantine text-type. Hermann von Soden suggested that it is related to the textual families Πa and Πb. Aland placed it in Category V. 
According to the Claremont Profile Method it represents the textual family Π266 in Luke 1 and Luke 20 (close to 593). In Luke 10 no profile was made.

History 
The manuscripts was added to the list of New Testament manuscripts by Scholz (1794-1852).
It was examined and described by Paulin Martin. C. R. Gregory saw the manuscript in 1885.

The manuscript is currently housed at the Bibliothèque nationale de France (Gr. 67) at Paris.

See also 

 List of New Testament minuscules
 Biblical manuscript
 Textual criticism

References 

Greek New Testament minuscules
13th-century biblical manuscripts
Bibliothèque nationale de France collections